In the United States, a foreign-trade zone (FTZ) is a geographical area, in (or adjacent to) a United States Port of Entry, where commercial merchandise, both domestic and foreign, receives the same Customs treatment it would if it were outside the commerce of the United States. The purpose of such zones is to help American businesses to be competitive in the global economy by reducing tariff burdens on the importation of foreign inputs and on exported finished products. Another definition of an FTZ states that it is an isolated, enclosed and policed area operated as a public utility, furnished with facilities for loading, unloading, handling, storing, manipulating, manufacturing and exhibiting goods and for reshipping them by land, water or air. Merchandise of every description may be held in the zone without being subject to tariffs (customs duties) and other ad valorem taxes. This tariff and tax relief is designed to lower the costs of U.S.-based operations engaged in international trade and thereby create and retain the employment and capital investment opportunities that result from those operations. 

These special geographic areas – foreign-trade zones – are established "in or adjacent to" U.S. Ports of Entry and are under the supervision of the U.S. Customs and Border Protection under the United States Homeland Security Council. The relevant state government must also have passed a law enabling the establishment of such zones. 

Since 1986, U.S. customs' oversight of FTZ operations has been conducted on an audit-inspection basis known as compliance reviews, whereby compliance is assured through audits and spot checks under a surety bond, rather than through on-site supervision by customs personnel.

There are over 230 foreign-trade zone projects and nearly 400 subzones in the United States.

History 
The U.S. foreign-trade zones program was created by the Foreign-Trade Zones Act of 1934. The Foreign-Trade Zones Act was one of two key pieces of legislation passed in 1934 in an attempt to mitigate some of the destructive effects of the Smoot-Hawley Tariffs, which had been imposed in 1930. The Foreign-Trade Zones Act was created to "expedite and encourage foreign commerce" in the United States.

Through World War II, manufacturing activity was allowed only on a very limited basis. In 1950, the original act was amended to open up FTZs to manufacturing, but it had little impact until 1980. In that year, Congress again amended the act so that products manufactured in the zones would not be assessed on U.S. value-added. This ensured that the only tariffs a producer inside the zone selling to U.S. customers would pay, would be on the raw materials imported into the zone. This "integrated" model, which replaced the previous "island" model, spurred growth in the U.S. foreign-trade zones program.

Benefits 
U.S. FTZs pose multiple benefits, other than duty deferred and inverted tariff, which companies can use to benefit their bottom line. However, a majority of companies are not utilizing FTZs to their full potential because sometimes the unknown creates uncertainty.

Some of the benefits of operating a FTZ include:
 Improved inventory management 
 Automated recordkeeping and document storage 
 Increased visibility of the supply chain
 Improved cash flow
 Improved company compliance
 Lessened U.S. regulatory agency requirements for re-export

Inverted tariff
Inverted tariff benefits exist when the duty rate for the overall finished good is lower than the duty rate of the component parts. Therefore, by manufacturing finished goods within an FTZ, US importers can take advantage of the inverted tariff duty rate, all while keeping manufacturing operations within the US. Inverted tariff works when an importer with manufacturing authority within an FTZ is allowed to admit their components into the zone duty-free, manufacture the finished good, and pay CBP duties on the foreign content in the finished good at the lower duty rate of the finished goods at the time of entry. The importer avoids paying the higher duty rate on the component parts and defers the lower duty payment on the value of the foreign content until the time of consumption in the commerce of the US. Inverted tariff is seen predominantly in the manufacturing industry, benefiting automotive, petroleum, pharmaceutical, aerospace, electronics, textile companies and many more.

Business in FTZs 
Any company in any industry can apply to be a part of an FTZ. Companies importing to the U.S. on a regular basis and in high volume are the main participants. It is a way to reduce importing costs and save money by participating in special customs procedures and simplifies processes to run more efficient inventory control systems.

The process to register into one used to be lengthy — 9 to 12 months, depending on the industry and if a FTZ is being created or if you are participating in one that already exists. This changed in 2011, when Alternative Site Framework (ASF) was introduced.

Alternative Site Framework 
Alternative Site Framework (ASF) provides a streamlined process for foreign-trade zone grantees to quickly expand operations within their given service area. Grantees that have transitioned over to ASF are granted 2,000 "virtual" acres to designate sites within their service area, sometimes as quickly as thirty (30) days. As opposed to the Traditional Site Framework, this ASF option doesn't require a grantee to go through a traditional boundary modification for expansion purposes. Companies now have the option to select between establishing their business in a usage-driven site or a magnet site.

Usage-driven sites 
Usage-driven sites are sites within a grantee's service area, that must go through a designation and activation process with the grantee and the Foreign-Trade Zone Board prior to initiating operations. Under ASF, usage-driven sites replace the role that subzones once held – allowing companies to operate under FTZ status while being located outside of what used to be called "general purpose zones" or now known as magnet sites under ASF.

Magnet sites 
Magnet sites are usually industrial parks or multi-tenant sites within a grantee's service area, which have already been designated by the Foreign-Trade Zone Board. Once a company that's established in said industrial park wants to operate as an FTZ, it must only go through the designation process with the help of the grantee and local customs. Under ASF, magnet sites replace the role that general purpose zones once held – industrial parks that serve commerce as a public utility.

Subzones 
A foreign-trade subzone is an area approved by the Foreign-Trade Zones Board for use by a specific company. Foreign-trade subzone companies enjoy all the same benefits as foreign-trade zone companies, but subzones are located outside existing general-purpose sites within 60 miles of the port of entry. Subzones allow companies that import and/or re-export products to take advantage of foreign-trade zone benefits without having to physically relocate within the foreign-trade zone general purpose sites. These sites are becoming obsolete with the implementation of ASF.

Alternate options – file for drawback
Companies have the ability, utilizing drawback filings, to recoup up to 99% of the duties paid on goods previously imported into the US, that are later exported and drawback can be claimed for goods exported up to three years prior to filing a claim with customs.

List of zones

See also
 Free trade zone
 List of free ports
 Title 15 of the Code of Federal Regulations

References

Further reading
  (About USA)

External links
 US Foreign-trade Zones maintained by the US Department of Commerce, International Trade Administration 
 List and map of U.S. Foreign Trade Zones
 Foreign-Trade Zones Board in the Federal Register
 Greater Indianapolis Foreign Trade Zone, Inc. – FTZ #72 – Indianapolis, IN